Maplewood–Manchester is a St. Louis MetroLink station. It is located on Manchester Road (Route 100) between South Hanley Road and Laclede Station Road in Maplewood, Missouri and serves residents and businesses in the surrounding area.

Walkways built along its viaducts connect to large industrial facilities to the north and south including Post Holdings, Caleres, and Sunnen Products. The Maplewood Commons shopping center can be accessed via a pedestrian crossing over the tracks further north. Most passengers arrive at this station on foot or by bus as there is no park and ride lot.

In 2007, Metro's Arts in Transit program commissioned the work If You Lived Here You’d be Home by Janet Zweig for installation at this station. Two sculptures illuminate both sides of the station viaduct. The artwork seen while entering Maplewood from the west is the word “MAPLEWOOD” written forwards. The letterforms were created from new construction materials, referencing the renovations occurring in Maplewood and the future of the city. While leaving Maplewood from the east, commuters will be presented with that same sign; however, it is purposely “reflected” and is constructed of salvaged construction materials from two local houses that were demolished in the fall of 2006. This reflected side is meant to remind viewers of Maplewood’s past.

Station layout
Maplewood-Manchester is an elevated station accessed by an elevator and stairs on the north side of Manchester Road and stairs on the south side of Manchester.

References

External links
 St. Louis Metro

MetroLink stations in St. Louis County, Missouri
Blue Line (St. Louis MetroLink)
Railway stations in the United States opened in 2006